Yoshihiko is a masculine Japanese given name.

Possible writings
Yoshihiko can be written using different combinations of kanji characters. Here are some examples:

義彦, "justice, elegant boy"
義比古, "justice, young man (archaic)" 
吉彦, "good luck, elegant boy"
吉比古, "good luck, young man (archaic)"
善彦, "virtuous, elegant boy"
芳彦, "virtuous/fragrant,  elegant boy"
良彦, "good, elegant boy"
慶彦, "congratulate, elegant boy"
由彦, "reason, to rise, elegant boy"
与志彦, "give, determination, elegant boy"
嘉彦, "excellent, elegant boy"
佳彦, "skilled, elegant boy"

The name can also be written in hiragana よしひこ or katakana ヨシヒコ.

Notable people with the name
Yoshihiko Amano (天野 佳彦, born 1971), Japanese basketball player
, Japanese Marxist historian
, Japanese politician
, Japanese novelist, poet, illustrator, manga artist and songwriter
, Japanese actor
, Japanese photographer
, Japanese chemist
, Japanese fencer
, emeritus general authority of The Church of Jesus
, Japanese volleyball player
, Japanese automobile designer
, Japanese footballer
Yoshihiko Nikawadori (born 1961), Japanese handball player
Yoshihiko Noda (野田 佳彦, born 1957), Japanese politician and Prime Minister of Japan
, Japanese swimmer
Yoshihiko Saito (斎藤 嘉彦, born 1972), Japanese hurdler
, Japanese baseball player
, Japanese animator and character designer
, Japanese painter
, Japanese judoka

Japanese masculine given names